Matthew Roche  was an Irish Roman Catholic bishop in the seventeenth century: he was appointed vicar Bishop of Leighlin by papal brief on 15 January 1622.

References

Bishops of Leighlin